Guru Hargobind Thermal Plant (GHTP Lehra Mohabbat) is located on National Highway No. 7 (earlier NH 64) which runs from Bathinda to Chandigarh.

The Generators used are cylindrical rotor type, that were manufactured in India by BHEL.

Source of water is from Bhatinda Branch of Sirhind Canal.

Capacity
It has an installed capacity of 920 MW.

See also

Guru Nanak Dev Thermal Plant
Guru Gobind Singh Super Thermal Power Plant

References

External links

Places to see Near Bathinda
Power shortage delayed paddy transplantation in Punjab

Coal-fired power stations in Punjab, India
Bathinda district
1999 establishments in Punjab, India
Energy infrastructure completed in 1999
20th-century architecture in India